Satyasandha Tirtha (1733 - 1794),  was a Hindu philosopher, scholar, mystic and saint. He was the 26th pontiff of Uttaradi Math and served the pontificate from 1783-1794.

Works
Most of the information about his life is derived from two hagiographies, Sri Satyasandha Vijaya by Koneratmaja and Guruvamsakathakalpatharu by Bhimadhaivajna. Satyasandha Tirtha is an author of one commentary, and one praise-poem, both his works are most revered among Madhwa community. His Viṣṇusahasranāmabhāṣya is a commentary on Vishnu Sahasranama. His another work is Vishnu Stuti, a praise-poem on Lord Vishnu.

In culture
Sri Satyasandha Vijaya is a story of the victory and biography of Satyasandha Tirtha. The hagiography was authored by Koneratmaja. Satyasandha was entombed with his living body and is believed to be alive in the Brindavana even today. A very marvellous incident is graphically described in Satyasandha Vijaya about being alive in the Brindavana many years after his entrance into it.

References

Bibliography

External links
Vishnusahasranama Bhashya (Sanskrit)

Indian Hindu saints
Madhva religious leaders
Dvaitin philosophers
Uttaradi Math
18th-century Indian philosophers